William Hartford James  (October 16, 1831 – February 1, 1920) was a Republican Nebraska politician best known as the acting governor of Nebraska.  He was also a member of the University of Nebraska-Lincoln Board of Regents during his tenure as governor.

James was born at Marion, Ohio.  He attended the public school and Marion Academy for two years  and worked on the family farm.  He began studying law on his own, and in 1853, James moved to Des Moines, Iowa, and joined a law firm.  He was admitted to the Iowa Bar Association in 1855 and moved to Sergeant Bluff to start his own legal practice.  He married Louisa Epler and they had four children.

Career
In 1857, James moved to Nebraska and staked a homestead claim in Dakota County.  He soon became active in local politics, serving as Justice of the Peace and County Attorney for Dakota County. In 1864 President Abraham Lincoln appointed James as register of the Dakota County Land Office.  After serving as register of the Dakota County Land Office for five years, James then ran on the Republican ticket and was elected Secretary of State in 1870.  In 1871, with the impeachment of Governor David Butler, James became Acting Governor of Nebraska until January 13, 1873. He was a member of the University of Nebraska board of regents from 1871 to 1873.

Later life
After serving out his term as acting governor, James returned to his legal practice.  In 1877, he was appointed register of the Colfax, Washington, Land Office. He held that position until his death in 1920.  He is interred in Colfax, Washington.

References

External links
 
  at the Nebraska State Historical Society
 The Encyclopedia of Nebraska
 World Trade Press
 National Governors Association
 

1831 births
1920 deaths
Republican Party governors of Nebraska
Secretaries of State of Nebraska
People from Marion, Ohio
Washington (state) Republicans